is a Japanese manga series written by Yū Sasuga and illustrated by Kenichi Tachibana. It was originally serialized in Shueisha's seinen manga magazine Miracle Jump from January to December 2011, and was transferred to Weekly Young Jump in April 2012. Its chapters have been collected in 22 tankōbon volumes as of 2018. Viz Media began publishing an English translation in 2014. Two original video animations (OVAs), abridging the Bugs 2 arc were released in 2014, and an animated television series, covering the Annex 1 arc was also shown in 2014. Also, a spin-off manga titled Terra for Police started on May 10, 2014 in Jump X. A live action film adaptation directed by Takashi Miike was released in 2016.

Plot

In an attempt to colonize Mars, 21st century scientists are tasked with terraforming the planet. Their goal is to seed the planet with a modified algae to absorb sunlight and purify the atmosphere, and cockroaches, whose corpses spread the algae across the planet as they feed.

Five hundred years later, the first crewed ship to Mars lands and its six crew members are attacked by giant mutated humanoid cockroaches with incredible physical strength, later labeled "Terraformars"; the crew is wiped out after sending a warning back to Earth. Two years later, BUGS II, a multinational expedition of genetically modified humans, is sent to collect 10 samples of both sexes of roaches, and exterminate the mutated bugs to take control of the red planet. Only two survivors manage to return to Earth, one swearing to return and avenge their fallen companions. As a third expedition is assembled questions are raised about the true origin of the Terraformars and their connection with an unknown disease afflicting mankind, the Alien Engine Virus, or A.E. Virus. To fight the Terraformars' strength and agility, members of the second and third expedition undergo genetic modification to inherit the characteristics of other organisms, only possible after having a special organ implanted with a 36% chance of surviving the surgery itself.

The third expedition ends with most of its crew members killed as well, be it by fighting the Terraformars, or amongst themselves in the multi-sided conflict between the various factions aboard the ship, each with own opposing interests. Despite that, the few survivors manage to collect enough samples for the research on a cure to the A.E. Virus and return home. However, a new fight against the Terraformars begins when it is revealed that the creatures arrived on Earth long before, and after multiplying at an alarming rate and adapting themselves far better to their new environment than they did to their homeworld, they start their plan to take over the planet.

Media

Manga
The manga, written by Yū Sasuga and illustrated by Kenichi Tachibana, was first serialized in Shueisha's Miracle Jump magazine from January 13 to December 13, 2011. It later moved to Weekly Young Jump starting on April 26, 2012, for the Annex I arc after the Bugs 2 arc concluded.

The series has inspired seven spin-off manga:

 , which began on May 10, 2014 in Jump X, was written by Manpuku Dō and illustrated by Kaito Shibano.
 , a parody by Shōta Hattori
 , an erotic gag series by Serebixi-Ryōsangata, were also published on May 10, 2014 on the Tonari no Young Jump website;
 , illustrated by Satoshi Kimura, ran from October 18, 2014, to February 19, 2015 in Ultra Jump, and focused on Adolph Reinhard;
 Terra Formars Gaiden Asimov, focusing on Sylvester Asimov before his trip to Mars, serialized in Grand Jump from November 4, 2015, to June 15, 2016, with illustrations by Boichi.
 Terra Formars Gaiden Keiji Onizuka, focusing on Keiji Onizuka before his trip to Mars, serializedMiracle Jump from December 15, 2015, to April 19, 2016, with illustrations by Saki Nonoyama.
 Terraho-kun, gag series, serialized in Weekly Young Jump from January 7, 2016, to April 14, 2016 with illustrations by Forbidden Shibukawa.

Volumes

Anime

An anime adaptation produced by Liden Films began airing on September 26, 2014, and finished airing on December 19, 2014 with a total of 13 episodes. The anime is licensed in the United Kingdom by Kazé UK and in North America by Viz Media. Madman Entertainment acquired the series for release in Australia and New Zealand.

A sequel to the anime titled Terra Formars: Revenge was announced in November 2015, with changes to the series' main staff and the main cast returning to reprise their roles. Liden Films and TYO Animations produced the sequel. The anime premiered on April 2, 2016.

An OVA adaptation of the manga's Earth Arc was planned for a May 2017 release, but was delayed to an August 2018 release instead.

Film

A live-action film based on Terra Formars was developed with Takashi Miike directing. It was released on April 29, 2016.

Novel
A light novel series based on Terra Formars was released on January 7, 2016, titled Terra Formars Lost Mission I by Akira Higashiyama. Another novel titled Terra Formars Lost Mission II by Yumeaki Hirayama, begun on January 19, 2016, in Miracle Jump.

Terra Formars The Outer Mission I was published on November 21, 2014 and written by Kenichi Fujiwara. A follow up novels titled Terra Formars The Outer Mission II and Terra Formars The Outer Mission III were later also released. The novels followed Tohei Tachibana and Elizabeth Rooney.

Games 
A Nintendo 3DS game titled Terra Formars: Akari Hoshi no Gekitou was released on April 2, 2015, developed by FuRyu. A pachislot/pachinko game machine was developed by KYORAKU and released in 2016 in Japan.

Reception
The 6th volume reached the number one place on the Oricon weekly manga chart in the week of August 19–25, 2013, with 317,248 copies. As of February 2015, the 11 first volumes of Terra Formars had over 10 million copies in circulation. As of August 2015, the series had sold 13 million copies. As of April 2018, the manga had over 16 million copies in print. As of November 2018, the manga had over 21 million copies in print.

Terra Formars was number one on the 2013 Kono Manga ga Sugoi! Top 20 Manga for Male Readers survey. It was placed second in Zenkoku Shotenin ga Eranda Osusume Comic 2013, a 2013 ranking of the top 15 manga recommended by Japanese bookstores. It was also nominated for the 6th Manga Taishō in the same year.

References

External links
Manga official site 
Anime official site 

2014 Japanese television series endings
Adventure anime and manga
Anime and manga about revenge
Biopunk anime and manga
Genetic engineering in fiction
Horror anime and manga
Insects in popular culture
Liden Films
Manga adapted into films
Mars in television
Fiction set on Mars
Shueisha franchises
Shueisha manga
Seinen manga
Television censorship in Japan
Viz Media anime
Viz Media manga
Warner Entertainment Japan franchises
Yumeta Company